Marcelo Palacio (born 4 April 1975) is an Argentine gymnast. He competed at the 1996 Summer Olympics.

References

External links
 

1975 births
Living people
Argentine male artistic gymnasts
Olympic gymnasts of Argentina
Gymnasts at the 1996 Summer Olympics
Place of birth missing (living people)